Laurin Dewey Woodworth (September 10, 1837 – March 13, 1897) was a U.S. Representative from Ohio and member of the Woodworth political family.

Biography

Education
Woodworth was born in Windham, Ohio, Woodworth attended the common schools, Windham (Ohio) Academy, Hiram (Ohio) College, and the Ohio State University at Columbus, Ohio. He studied law at Union Law College, Cleveland, Ohio.
He was admitted to the bar in 1859 and commenced practice in Ravenna, Ohio.

Public Service
He served as member of the Portage County Board of School Examiners. During the American Civil War, he served in the Union Army as major of the One Hundred and Fourth Ohio Volunteer Infantry from July 1862 to December 1862. He moved to Youngstown, Ohio, in 1864 and resumed the practice of law.

Woodworth was elected to the State senate in 1867. He was reelected in 1869 and served as president pro tempore. Woodworth was elected as a Republican to the Forty-third and Forty-fourth Congresses (March 4, 1873 – March 3, 1877). He was an unsuccessful candidate for renomination in 1876 to the Forty-fifth Congress, losing to future U.S. President William McKinley.

He continued the practice of law in Youngstown, Ohio, until his death there on March 13, 1897. He was interred in Windham Cemetery, Windham, Ohio.

References

 Retrieved on 2008-10-18

External links

1837 births
1897 deaths
Ohio State University alumni
Hiram College alumni
People from Ravenna, Ohio
Politicians from Youngstown, Ohio
Union Army officers
Republican Party Ohio state senators
Laurin
19th-century American politicians
People from Windham, Ohio
Republican Party members of the United States House of Representatives from Ohio